Mustafa Şerif İlden (1877, Veles – 1952, Istanbul) was a Turkish career officer, diplomat and far-right politician.

Biography

He was born in Veles. His father, Hüseyin Avni Bey, was a civil servant in Skopje. Şerif Bey graduated from the Manastır Military High School in 1891 and the Istanbul Field Artillery School in 1895. In the same year, he entered the Military Academy with the rank of lieutenant. When the Balkan Wars broke out, he was the Chief of Staff of the Western Army. On January 8, 1914, he was appointed as the Chief of Staff of the 9th Corps in Erzurum. He participated in World War I. He was taken prisoner by the Russians on the Sarıkamış Front on 29 January 1915. The life of captivity in Siberia lasted three years. In January 1918 he escaped to Constantinople. He retired on March 31, 1918. After 1923, he held diplomatic positions between 1935 and 1939.

References 

1877 births
1952 deaths
Republican People's Party (Turkey) politicians
Ottoman people of World War I
People from Veles, North Macedonia
Date of birth missing
Date of death missing
Ottoman prisoners of war
World War I prisoners of war held by Russia
Ottoman Army officers
20th-century Turkish diplomats
Members of the Grand National Assembly of Turkey